Haleys Branch is a tributary to Crabtree Creek that rises just south of the Raleigh-Durham (RDU) airport then flows south to meet Crabtree Creek in Lake Crabtree. The watershed is about 68% forested.

See also
List of rivers of North Carolina

References

External links
 Fish Brain (Haleys Branch)

Rivers of North Carolina
Rivers of Wake County, North Carolina
Tributaries of Pamlico Sound